Myers Hall may refer to:

Myers Hall (University of Georgia), a college dormitory
Myers Hall (Springfield, Ohio), listed on the U.S. National Register of Historic Places in Ohio
Myers Hall (Indiana University), a college building

Architectural disambiguation pages